Heydarabad (also Romanized as Ḩeydarābād and Haidarābād) is a village in Jarqavieh Vosta Rural District, Jarqavieh Sofla District, Isfahan County, Isfahan Province, Iran. At the 2006 census, its population was 632, in 162 families.

References 

Populated places in Isfahan County